Panagrellus is a genus of nematodes belonging to the family Panagrolaimidae.

The species of this genus are found in Northern America.

Species:

Panagrellus dorsobidentata 
Panagrellus dubius
Panagrellus filiformis 
Panagrellus ludwigi 
Panagrellus nepenthicola 
Panagrellus pycnus 
Panagrellus redividus 
Panagrellus redivivoides 
Panagrellus redivivus 
Panagrellus ulmi 
Panagrellus ventrodentatus

References

Nematodes